Roquito "Roque" R. Ablan, Jr. (April 22, 1932 – March 26, 2018) was a Filipino politician who served as representative from Ilocos Norte. He is one of the most prominent politicians in Ilocos Norte, having served 8 terms in Congress.

Early life and education 
He was born on April 22, 1932 in Laoag City, Ilocos Norte. He was the son of former Ilocos Norte governor Roque Ablan, Sr. and Dona Manuela R. Ablan. He graduated from the University of the Philippines College of Law where he joined the Upsilon Sigma Phi fraternity with Benigno "Ninoy" Aquino, Jr. in 1950.

Ablan was known to be a close ally of President Ferdinand Marcos. In an interview, Ablan mentioned that he ran errands to deliver bar examination review materials to a then-detained Marcos.

Political career 
He was first elected as Ilocos Norte provincial board member in 1963, and concurrently served as Chairman of the League of Provincial Board Members in the Philippines until 1967.

In 1967, he was elected into the House of Representatives through a special election and served until 1972. He was also elected to the 1971 Constitutional Convention as a delegate from Ilocos Norte. After the 1986 People Power Revolution, he was again elected as representative of Ilocos Norte and served from 1987 to 1998 and from 2001 to 2010, respectively. During these terms, he chaired the congressional committees on Housing, Dangerous Drugs, and Inter-Parliamentary Relations and Diplomacy. Among his notable legislation include the Rent Control Act of 2009, the Death Penalty Law, and the Magna Carta for Migrant Workers. 

In 1998, he ran for Ilocos Norte governor but lost to Ferdinand "Bongbong" Marcos Jr.

Legal career 
In 1968, Ablan and Filipino lawyer and bar topnotcher Amado M. Santiago, Jr. co-founded Ablan & Santiago, a law firm which held office at Ermita, Manila. Ablan later on left the firm to run for public office.

Military service 
Ablan served as a soldier under the 5th Special Forces of the United States of America in Vietnam. Although an incumbent Ilocos Norte Representative, he was also a member of the Philippine Civic Action Group (PHILCAG) in South Vietnam from 1968 to 1975.

Death 
Ablan died on March 26, 2018 in St. Luke's Medical Center, Taguig City. He is buried in the Maharlika cemetery in Laoag City. 

He is survived by his son, PCOO Assistant Secretary and former Ilocos Norte Board Member Kristian Ablan.

References 

1932 births
21st-century Filipino politicians
20th-century Filipino lawyers
Members of the House of Representatives of the Philippines from Ilocos Norte
University of the Philippines Diliman alumni
2018 deaths